Saint Paul Catholic Church is a Roman Catholic parish in New Bern, North Carolina within the jurisdiction of the Roman Catholic Diocese of Raleigh. Its Main Campus is located at 3005 Country Club Rd. Its historic parish church is located at 504 Middle Street. Although most Masses are held at the main campus, the Parish continues to celebrate Friday Mass at 8 a.m. at the historic church. The Parish also hosts a parochial school, St. Paul Catholic School.

The historic church, built in 1840–1841 and the oldest Catholic Church in North Carolina, is a Greek Revival rectangular frame structure three bays wide and four bays deep covered by a gable roof. It features a central square projecting entrance tower, added in 1896. It was listed on the National Register of Historic Places in 1972.

References

External links

Historic American Buildings Survey in North Carolina
Roman Catholic churches in North Carolina
Churches in New Bern, North Carolina
Roman Catholic Diocese of Raleigh
Churches on the National Register of Historic Places in North Carolina
Religious organizations established in 1824
Roman Catholic churches completed in 1841
Greek Revival church buildings in North Carolina
19th-century Roman Catholic church buildings in the United States
National Register of Historic Places in Craven County, North Carolina
Wooden churches in North Carolina